Virva Junkkari (born 14 October 1977) is a Finnish footballer who plays as a goalkeeper. Junkkari represented the Finnish women's national football team, 15 times. Virva Junkkari greatest achievement was winning Serie A with S.S. Lazio.

International career

Junkkari was also part of the Finnish team at the 2005 European Championships.

References

1977 births
Living people
Women's association football goalkeepers
Serie A (women's football) players
S.S. Lazio Women 2015 players
Helsingin Jalkapalloklubi (women) players
Finnish women's footballers
Finland women's international footballers